Lilian Ajio (born 6 December 1984) is an Ugandan netball player who represents Uganda internationally and plays in the position of goal defense. She has represented Uganda at the 2018 Commonwealth Games and at the 2019 Netball World Cup.

References 

1984 births
Living people
Ugandan netball players
Netball players at the 2018 Commonwealth Games
Commonwealth Games competitors for Uganda
2019 Netball World Cup players